Chorleywood is a London Underground and National Rail station in Travelcard Zone 7 (previously zone B) on the Metropolitan line. Chorleywood station is also served by Chiltern Railways, which runs trains from London Marylebone station through to Aylesbury.

History

The station was built by expanding the local train station and was opened as "Chorley Wood" in July 1889. The name was changed to "Chorley Wood & Chenies" in November 1915 until 1934 when it reverted to the original name until 1965. The present name has existed since then.
Chorleywood station was formerly served by steam-hauled Metropolitan line trains from Aylesbury to London, with a changeover to an electric locomotive at Rickmansworth. Steam trains were withdrawn in 1961 when electrification north of Rickmansworth to Amersham and Chesham was completed. From the early 1960s to 2012, Metropolitan line trains at Chorleywood were formed of London Underground A60 Stock (and the almost identical A62 Stock), but were replaced by London Underground S8 stock. Chiltern Railways (Aylesbury-Marylebone) trains are formed by Class 165 diesel multiple units.

Since December 2011 only a few morning peak hour Metropolitan line trains have been operated as fast trains, at other times the trains mostly call at all stations, adding over 10 minutes to journey times. The journey to central London takes around 35–50 minutes depending on the line and time of day.

Station layout
The station has two platforms shared between the London Underground Metropolitan line and National Rail. Both platforms are accessible from street level.

Services

Metropolitan line 
The Metropolitan line is the only line on the London Underground to operate an express service. This is southbound in the morning peaks and northbound in the evening peaks. Southbound fast trains run non-stop between Moor Park, Harrow-on-the-Hill and Finchley Road. Southbound semi-fast trains only run non-stop between Harrow-on-the-Hill and Finchley Road. Northbound fast and semi-fast trains call additionally at Wembley Park before running non-stop between the aforementioned stations.

The off-peak service in trains per hour (tph) presently consists of:
 4tph to Aldgate (all stations)
 2tph to Amersham
 2tph to Chesham
The morning peak service in trains per hour (tph) presently consists of:
 4tph to Aldgate (fast)
 2tph to Aldgate (semi-fast)
 4tph to Amersham
 2tph to Chesham
The evening peak service in trains per hour (tph) presently consists of:
 2tph to Baker Street (all stations)
 4tph to Aldgate via Baker Street (all stations)
 4tph to Amersham
 2tph to Chesham

Chiltern Railways 
Chiltern Railways operate services between Aylesbury Vale Parkway via Amersham and Aylesbury and London Marylebone via Harrow on the Hill. All Chiltern Railway services run non stop between Rickmansworth and Harrow on the Hill and Harrow on the Hill and London Marylebone.

The off-peak service in trains per hour (tph) presently consists of:
 2tph to London Marylebone
 1tph to Aylesbury
 1tph to Aylesbury Vale Parkway via Aylesbury

References

External links

 

Metropolitan line stations
Tube stations in Hertfordshire
Railway stations in Three Rivers District
Former Metropolitan and Great Central Joint Railway stations
Railway stations in Great Britain opened in 1889
Railway stations served by Chiltern Railways